Federal Medical Centre, Jalingo  also known as FMC Jalingo, is a federal government of Nigeria's hospital located in Jalingo, Taraba State, Nigeria. It was in Novembe, 1999 with Dr. Daniel as its first Medical Director. The current chief medical director is Aisha Shehu Adamu.


History 
Federal Medical Centre, Jalingo was established in November, 1999. The hospital was formerly known as General Hospital, Jalingo.

MISSION 
The mission of the hospital as appears in its official website is: "To provide effective, efficient and affordable healthcare services to the citizenry in line with the Federal Government’s objectives for the healthcare delivery system."

VISION 
The vision of the hospital as stated in its website is: "To transform the Federal Medical Centre Jalingo into a centre noted for high quality medical care and a centre of excellence in the control of infectious diseases through surveillance, monitoring and clinical intervention."

CMD 
The current chief medical director is Aisha Shehu Adamu.

MANAGEMENT STAFF 
The top management staff of the hospital as outlined in the hospital's website are:

 Barr. Okey-Ezea - Board Chairman
 Dr. Aisha Sehu Adamu - Chief Medical Director
 Adamu Ardo - Director of Administration
 Dr. Wanonyi K. Ishaya - Head of Clinical Services
 Isaac Onifade Ayedole - Chief Accountant
 Abdurrazaq Isa Imam - Head of Internal Audit
 Dr. Suleiman A. Kirim - Deputy HCS Clinical
 Dr. Kuni Israkeb Joseph - Deputy CMAC Admin
 Hajara A. Mazang - Head of Nursing Services
 Hadi Habu - Head of Works Maintenance

DEPARTMENTS AND SERVICES 
The departments and services carryout by this hospital as enshrined in their website include:

 Administration Department
 Anesthesia Department 
 Dentistry Department  
 Family Medicine Department  
 Finance and Accounts Department  
 Internal Audit Department  
 Internal Medicine Department
 Medical Records Department
 Medical Social Services Department  
 Medical Laboratory Services Department  
 Nursing Services Department  
 Nutrition and Dietetics Department 
 Obstetrics and Gynecology Department  
 Ophthalmology Department  
 Pediatrics Department  
 Pathology Department  
 Pharmacy Department
 Physiotherapy Department  
 Radiology Department  
 Surgery Department  
 Works and Maintenance Department

References 

Hospitals in Nigeria